Malcolm McCredie (born 3 October 1942) is a former Australian cyclist. He competed in the individual road race at the 1964 Summer Olympics.

McCredie set the fastest time in the amateur Goulburn to Sydney Classic in 1964 run in reverse direction from Milperra to Goulburn.

References

External links
 

1942 births
Living people
Australian male cyclists
Olympic cyclists of Australia
Cyclists at the 1964 Summer Olympics
Place of birth missing (living people)